General elections were held in Jamaica on 20 December 1949. Although the People's National Party received more votes, the Jamaica Labour Party won a majority of seats. Voter turnout was 65.2%. , this election was the last time a politician unaffiliated with a political party was elected to the legislature.

Results

References

General election
Elections in Jamaica
Jamaica